East Central State is a former administrative division of Nigeria. It was created on 27 May 1967 from parts of the Eastern Region and existed until 3 February 1976, when it was divided into two states - Anambra and Imo. The area now comprises five states; Anambra, Imo, Enugu, Ebonyi and Abia.  The city of Enugu was the capital of East Central State.

East Central State Leaders
Ukpabi Asika, Administrator (1967 – July 1975)
Anthony Ochefu, Governor (July 1975 – February 1976)

References 

Former Nigerian administrative divisions
States and territories established in 1967